Old Sogdian is a Unicode block containing characters for a group of related, non-cursive Sogdian writing systems used to write historic Sogdian in the 3rd to 5th centuries CE.

Block

History
The following Unicode-related documents record the purpose and process of defining specific characters in the Old Sogdian block:

Font 
There is a Unicode font encoding Old Sogdian - Noto Sans Old Sogdian.

References 

Unicode blocks